Cerro Negro Formation may refer to:
 Cerro Negro Formation, Antarctica, an Aptian geologic formation in Antarctica
 Cerro Negro Formation, Argentina, an Ediacaran geologic formation in Argentina
 Cerro Negro Formation, Venezuela, an Early Pliocene geologic formation in Venezuela